The Lancasters is a residential development in London, England, with 77 apartments, the majority of which face south with views onto or across Hyde Park.

History 

The building was originally a terrace of 15 stucco-fronted Grade-II listed houses dating from the mid-nineteenth century.  It was purchased by a joint venture between the investment and development company Minerva and the developer Northacre Plc.

The building underwent significant redevelopment.  It was completely demolished behind the French Renaissance style façade, which was retained in one of the longest façade development projects in Europe.

It took almost 11 months and 500 tons of steel to support the entire 407 ft. long façade, which is the equivalent length of 15 AEC Routemaster buses end-to-end.

The Lancasters is considered to be the first super prime development in W2 and commands premium prices throughout the building.
The scheme which incorporates private residential accommodation was a joint venture between the investment and development company Minerva and developer Northacre Plc. It is now entirely owned by Northacre Plc.

It was designed by Nilsson Architects and built by Capita Symonds.

Location 

The building is located in Bayswater area of London, adjacent to Hyde Park. It sits between the Lancaster Gate and Queensway Underground stations on the Central line, taking up the length of block between Leinster Terrace and Lancaster Gate. The address is: The Lancasters, 75–89 Lancaster Gate, London W2 3NH.

References

Further reading 

Ike Ijeh, Building magazine, 10 June 2011 
Arabella Youens, Country Life, 19 February 2009  
Francesca Steele, Financial Times, 4 April 2014

External links 
The Lancasters
Northacre Plc
Minerva

Grade II listed buildings in the City of Westminster
Apartment buildings in London
Bayswater